NBA 06 is a basketball video game which was released on October 4, 2005, for the PSP and November 1, 2005, on PlayStation 2. It is the 1st installment of the NBA series by Sony Computer Entertainment.

Gameplay 
In The Life, the players take role of an NBA rookie. First, you must create your player and then go to pre-draft training camp of the team. After that the draft starts, and the character get picked. During the games, the player has to complete goals like scoring a certain number of points or holding their star to no steals. If there is a failure of at least one of the goals, the event will start all over again.

Reception

NBA 06 received "mixed or average reviews" on both platforms according to the review aggregation website Metacritic.

References

External links

2005 video games
National Basketball Association video games
PlayStation 2 games
PlayStation Portable games
Sony Interactive Entertainment games
North America-exclusive video games
Video games developed in the United States
San Diego Studio games
Multiplayer and single-player video games